Binondo Church, formally known as the Minor Basilica and National Shrine of Saint Lorenzo Ruiz - Parish of Our Lady of the Most Holy Rosary, is located in the District of Binondo, Manila fronting Plaza San Lorenzo Ruiz, in the Philippines. This church was founded by Dominican priests in 1596  to serve their Chinese converts to Christianity. The original building was destroyed in 1762 by British bombardment. A new granite church was completed on the same site in 1852 however it was greatly damaged during the Second World War, with only the western façade and the octagonal belfry surviving.

Saint Lorenzo Ruiz, who was born of a Chinese father and a Filipino mother, trained in this church and afterwards went as a missionary to Japan, where he and his companions were martyred  for refusing to renounce Christianity. Lorenzo is the Philippines' first saint, and was canonized by Pope John Paul II in 1987. A large statue of the saint stands in front of the church.

Masses are held in Filipino, Mandarin, Hokkien, and English. As of 2022, the present parish priest and shrine rector is Rev. Msgr. Esteban U. Lo, LRMS.

Historical background

Even before the arrival of the Spanish to the Philippines there was already a community of Chinese traders living in Manila. The population of Chinese traders increased with the advent of Spanish colonization of the Philippines, due to increased trade between the islands. The upsurge in their population prompted the Catholic Missionaries to manage the conversion of the Chinese population to the Christian faith.

In 1596, Dominican priests founded Binondo church to serve their Chinese converts to Christianity as well as to the native Filipinos.

Architecture
It was built by the Dominicans. Founded in 1596, a church had been constructed before 1614. When transferred to its present site in the 18th century, a new church was built to accommodate new churchgoers. In 1778, the roof was replaced with nipa as the wood was destroyed by termites. In 1863, the church was slightly damaged by earthquake. The original structure has sustained damages during wars and various natural disasters.

Domingo Cruz y Gonzales supervised the construction of the dome in 1781.

The current granite church was completed on the same site in 1852 and features an octagonal pagoda-like bell tower which suggests the Chinese culture of the parishioners. The church was burned during the British invasion of 1762. Another one was quickly built following the occupation. Improvements were made in the 18th century but the edifice was again destroyed in the 1863 earthquake. It was rebuilt in the grandeur the remains on which we see today. Before the war, it was considered as one of the most beautiful churches in the country. Its bell tower was composed of five stories, octagonal in shape. At its top was a mirador (viewing window). This roof was destroyed during the 1863 earthquake.

American bombing on September 22, 1944, destroyed the structure. Everything including the archives of the parish were burned. Nothing was left behind except the stone walls of the church and the fire-tiered octagonal belltower. After the war, Binondo parishioners had to make do with a roofless church for several years until it was rebuilt in the 1950s.

The roof behind the pediment and the walls at the left of the façade are additions in the past years. The original façade, with some few renovations, is similar to that of the Italian High Renaissance churches. The façade is buttressed on the sides by pilaster mass terminated by urn-like decorations. A tower is found at the apex of the pediment. At the base of the pediment, along its central axis, is a small circular window framed by smaller columns and pediment which are framed by a foliated scroll. At the right is the huge, octagonal tower characterized by cantons at its angles and pedimented window openings.

The present church and convent was renovated between 1946 and 1971.

Trivia
The current main altar of the church is loosely modeled after the façade of St. Peter's Basilica in Vatican City.
The basilica has been reconstructed many times due to natural calamities and only the belfry is what remains of the original 16th century structure.
Andrés Bonifacio and his second wife, Gregoria de Jesús were wed in Catholic rites in the church in March 1893 or 1894. The couple had also undergone a marriage ceremony under the Katipunan, the secret society that Bonifacio headed as part of the Philippine Revolution against the Spanish Empire.

Gallery

References

Roman Catholic churches in Manila
Buildings and structures in Binondo
Cultural Properties of the Philippines in Metro Manila
Basilica churches in the Philippines
Roman Catholic national shrines in the Philippines
Churches in the Roman Catholic Archdiocese of Manila